The  is a figure from Irish Folklore. She is depicted as a beautiful woman of the Aos Sí ("people of the barrows") who takes a human lover. Lovers of the leannán sídhe are said to live brief, though highly inspired, lives. The name comes from the Gaelic words for a sweetheart, lover, or concubine and the term for inhabitants of fairy mounds (fairy). While the leannán sídhe is most often depicted as a female fairy, there is at least one reference to a male leannán sídhe troubling a mortal woman.

A version of the myth was popularized during the Celtic Revival in the late 19th-century. The leannán sídhe is mentioned by Jane Wilde, writing as "Speranza", in her 1887 Ancient Legends, Mystic Charms and Superstitions of Ireland. W. B. Yeats popularized his own 'newly-ancient' version of the leannán sídhe, emphasizing the spirit's almost vampiric tendencies.  As he imagined it, the leannán sídhe is depicted as a beautiful muse who offers inspiration to an artist in exchange for their love and devotion; although the supernatural affair leads to madness and eventual death for the artist:

In literature and pop culture 

A number of traditional Irish tales feature characters that appear to draw from the leannán sídhe legend for inspiration. These include Katharine Mary Briggs's "The Fairy Follower" in Folktales of England, the story "Oisin in the Land of Youth" in Ancient Irish Tales, "The Dream of Angus" in Augusta, Lady Gregory's Cuchulain of Muirthemne.

The old Irish song "My Lagan Love" uses her as a metaphor for consuming love: "And like a love-sick lennan-shee/She hath my heart in thrall,/Nor life I own nor liberty/For love is lord of all."

Modern fantasy novels often include characters based on Irish mythology. Examples include The Dresden Files, by Jim Butcher, with a recurring character named Leanansidhe (or Lea for short) and The Iron Fey Series, by Julie Kagawa. Also the book Ink Exchange (April 2008), a part of the Wicked Lovely series, by Melissa Marr.

Starring in the Japanese manga "Mahoutsukai no Yome (The Ancient Magus' Bride)" volume 3, by Kore Yamazaki a leannan sidhe lives with Joel Garland where Chise meets in his rose garden.

The 2017 horror movie MUSE, written and directed by John Burr, features her as the mythical and deadly spirit who becomes the muse and lover of a painter.

See also
Irish mythology in popular culture
Banshee
Baobhan sith
Cliodhna
Dames Blanches
Hulder
Pontianak
Rusalka
Samodiva
Sayona
Soucouyant
Succubus
Weiße Frauen
Witte Wieven

References

Further reading

 Spooky Irish October - October 2007 Emerald Reflections - by Brian Witt

Aos Sí
Fairies
Fantasy creatures
Female legendary creatures
Irish folklore
Irish legendary creatures
Tuatha Dé Danann